The General Satellite Control Center(위성관제총합지휘소) is the main mission control center of North Korea's space program. It is located in Pothonggang District, Pyongyang in a two-storey white building, and controlled by the Korean Committee of Space Technology. The mission control center was first shown in 2009 in the KCTV broadcasting announcing the launching of the satellite Kwangmyongsong-2. Late leader Kim Jong-il visited the control center with Kim Jong-un in 2009 before the launch of the Kwangmyongsong-2 satellite.

References

Space program of North Korea
Ground stations
2005 establishments in North Korea
Buildings and structures in Pyongyang
Buildings and structures completed in 2005